Annemette Jensen (born 11 April 1972) is a Danish long-distance runner. She competed in the women's marathon at the 2004 Summer Olympics.

References

1972 births
Living people
Athletes (track and field) at the 2004 Summer Olympics
Danish female long-distance runners
Danish female marathon runners
Olympic athletes of Denmark
Place of birth missing (living people)
Universiade medalists in athletics (track and field)
Universiade bronze medalists for Denmark